Kees Jan René Klompenhouwer (born 1954) is a Dutch diplomat. He is the current Ambassador of the Netherlands to the Czech Republic.

Education 

Kees Klompenhouwer obtained an MA Economics in 1979, at Erasmus University Rotterdam.

Career 

 1/5/2008 - EU Civilian Operations Commander and Director of the Civilian Planning and Conduct Capability (CPCC) 
 2006-2008 Director East- and South Eastern Europe Department Ministry of Foreign Affaires, The Hague
 2002-2006 Director for Foreign Intelligence, General Intelligence and Security Service (AIVD) 
 1999-2002 Ambassador Extraordinary and Plenipotentiairy to Serbia, Belgrade 
 1995-1999 Defense Counsellor, Netherlands Permanent Mission to NATO, Brussels 
 1992-1995 Head Military Cooperation Section, Ministry of Foreign Affairs, The Hague 
 1987-1992 First Secretary at the Netherlands Permanent Mission to the United Nations in Geneva 
 1983-1987 Policy Officer European Union Department, Ministry of Foreign Affairs, The Hague 
 1980-1983 United Nations Department, Ministry of Foreign Affairs, The Hague 
 1979-1980 Lecturer in economics for students from developing countries, Research Institute for Management Science, Delft

Family 

Kees Klompenhouwer is married and has three children. His wife, Joosje Brouwer, is a Russian-Dutch/Dutch-Russian translator; she's also a musician (classical guitar teacher), she has graduated from ITV Hogeschool voor Tolken en Vertalen University in Utrecht.

References 

1954 births
Living people
Ambassadors of the Netherlands to Ukraine
Erasmus University Rotterdam alumni
People from Jura-North Vaudois District